Lars Blixt (born 13 October 1965) is a retired Swedish football striker.

References

1965 births
Living people
Swedish footballers
Trelleborgs FF players
Association football forwards
Allsvenskan players
Place of birth missing (living people)